Al-Mahmudiya is a district in Baghdad Governorate, Iraq. Its seat is Mahmoudiyah.

This ratio is the result of the Iraqi Civil War of 2006–2007, when the Shias of Yusufiya and Iskandariya moved to Mahmudiya, and the Sunnis of Mahmudiya sought refuge in the other two cities. Most of the inhabitants live in rural areas.

Tribal inhabitants of the district are of five tribes: Al Janabi, Dulaim, Al Ubaid, Qarghoul and Al Jubour

Cities

 Al Latifiya
 Jurf Al Sakhr

See also
 Yusufiyah

Districts of Babil Governorate

ar:المحمودية (العراق)